Venn is a surname and a given name.

Venn may also refer to:

 VENN, an American 24/7 streaming television network based in Playa Vista, California
 Venn, Saskatchewan, Canada, an unincorporated community
 Venn, a 2016 album by British band Clock Opera
 Vennbahn or Venn Railway, a former railway line in Belgium

See also
 Venn diagram, a diagram that shows all possible logical relations between a finite collection of sets